White Rock Wind Farm  is a wind farm in the Australian state of New South Wales. It is south of the Gwydir Highway. The Sapphire Wind Farm is north of the highway and Glen Innes Wind Farm is south of the highway closer to Glen Innes. It is approved for up to 119 wind turbines, and stage 1 has been completed with 70 turbines. In 2011 it had an estimated construction cost of A$450m.

Operations 
The wind farm began increasing output grid power in July 2017, was fully commissioned in February 2018 and has operated since then. The generation table uses eljmkt nemlog to obtain generation values for each month. 

Note: Asterisk indicates power output was limited during the month.

References

Wind farms in New South Wales
New England (New South Wales)